Continental Bank was a bank in China. It specialized in savings, warehouses, trusts and real estate business. It was founded in Tianjin in 1919 by Feng Guozhang, the acting president of Republic of China and Tan Lisun, the former Nanjing director of Bank of China. Half a month later, a Beijing branch was also established. In 1942, its headquarters was moved to Shanghai. In 1952, it was closed down.

Tha bank, together with Yien Yieh Commercial Bank, Kincheng Banking Corporation and China & South Sea Bank, are called "Four Northern Banks", which were the four most capitalized commercial banks in Northern China in the 1920s.

See also 

 Four Northern Banks

References 

Defunct banks of China
Companies based in Tianjin
Banks based in Shanghai
Banks disestablished in 1952
Banks established in 1919
Chinese companies established in 1919